Waimangaroa is a small town located on the West Coast of New Zealand.

The township lies on the south-west bank of the Waimangaroa River, at the western foot of the Denniston Plateau. The Bridle Track, a  scenic bush track, leads south-east along the Denniston Incline into the foothills of the Mt William Range, to Denniston. The Stockton mine, a large open cast coal mine, is operated in the vicinity by Solid Energy.

The Ngakawau Branch, a branch line railway, runs through the town.  It opened to Waimangaroa on 5 August 1876; it formerly ran to Seddonville but now terminates in Ngakawau.  From 1877 until 1967, Waimangaroa was also the junction for the Conns Creek Branch, which ran east alongside the Waimangaroa River to the foot of the Denniston Incline.  Passenger services ceased on the Conns Creek Branch in 1931 and Ngakawau Branch on 14 October 1946.  Since this time, the railway through Waimangaroa has almost solely conveyed coal.

The beaches to the west have dangerous currents and are not safe for swimming.

Demographics

The population of Waimangaroa was 231 in the 2018 census, a decrease of 18 from 2013, and an increase of 6 from 2006. There were 123 males and 105 females. 204 people  (88.3%) identified as European/Pākehā, 27 (11.7%) as Māori, 3 (1.3%) as Pacific peoples, and 3 (1.3%) as Asian. 48 people  (20.8%) were under 15 years old, 18 (7.8%) were 15–29, 105 (45.5%) were 30–64, and 57 (24.7%) were over 65.

Education
Waimangaroa School was a coeducational full primary school (years 1-8). The school celebrated its 125th jubilee in 2004. It closed permanently in 2012 and is now in private ownership. Waimangaroa children now attend schools in Westport.

Notable people 

 Becky Manawatu (born 1982), writer

References

Buller District
Populated places in the West Coast, New Zealand